Ziros may refer to:

Ziros, Lasithi, a village on the island Crete, Greece
Ziros, Preveza, a municipality in the Preveza regional unit, Greece
Lake Ziros, a lake in the Preveza regional unit, Greece